Quaderni is an Italian village and hamlet (frazione) of the commune of Villafranca di Verona, in the Veneto. It has an estimated population of 1,618.

History
The village became an autonomous parish in 1583. Its name, in Italian, means "notebooks".

Geography
Quaderni lies on a plain between Villafranca (6 km northeast), Valeggio sul Mincio (5 km northwest), and Mozzecane (3 km southeast); and next to the borders of Veneto with Lombardy. It is 9 km from Roverbella (in the Province of Mantua), 8 from Povegliano Veronese, 23 from Verona and 24 from Mantua.

See also
Dossobuono
Rosegaferro
Villafranca di Verona
Verona-Villafranca Airport

References

External links

 Villafranca di Verona municipal website

Frazioni of the Province of Verona